Bozum may refer to:
 Bozum (West Frisian: Boazum), Netherlands